FedEx Corporation, formerly Federal Express Corporation and later FDX Corporation, is an American multinational conglomerate holding company focused on transportation, e-commerce and business services based in Memphis, Tennessee. The name "FedEx" is a syllabic abbreviation of the name of the company's original air division, Federal Express, which was used from 1973 until 2000. FedEx today is best known for its air delivery service, FedEx Express, which was one of the first major shipping companies to offer overnight delivery as a flagship service. Since then, FedEx also started FedEx Ground, FedEx Office (originally known as Kinko's), FedEx Supply Chain, FedEx Freight, and various other services across multiple subsidiaries, often meant to respond to its main competitor, UPS. FedEx is also one of the top contractors of the US government and assists in the transport of some United States Postal Service packages through their Air Cargo Network contract.

FedEx's prominence in both the United States and the world have made it a common topic in popular culture, with examples including the film Cast Away as well as some of its marketing slogans (most famously "when it absolutely positively has to be there overnight"). In addition, FedEx has purchased the naming rights to FedExField of the NFL's Washington Commanders and FedExForum of the NBA's Memphis Grizzlies. FedEx's air shipping services have made its main hub (aka the "Superhub") at Memphis International Airport the busiest cargo airport in the world by 2020.

It is the fifth largest United States–based employer globally with 547,000 employees.

History

Foundation and early history 

The company was founded in Little Rock, Arkansas in 1971 as Federal Express Corporation by Frederick W. Smith, a graduate of Yale University. He drew up the company's concept in a term paper at Yale, in which he called for a system specifically designed for urgent deliveries. While his professor didn't think much of the idea, Smith pressed on. He began formal operations in 1973, when he moved operations to Memphis. Smith said he chose Memphis International Airport for being near the mean population center of the country and for its placid weather.

The company grew rapidly, and by 1983 had a billion dollars in revenues, a rarity for a startup company that had never taken part in mergers or acquisitions in its first decade. It expanded to Europe and Asia in 1984. In 1988, it acquired one of its major competitors, Flying Tiger Line, creating the largest full-service cargo airline in the world. In 1994, Federal Express shortened its name to "FedEx" for marketing purposes, officially adopting a nickname that had been used for years.

Reorganization and Caliber acquisition 

On October 2, 1997, FedEx reorganized as a holding company, FDX Corporation, a Delaware corporation. The new holding company began operations in January 1998, with the acquisition of Caliber System Inc. by Federal Express. With the purchase of Caliber, FedEx started offering other services besides express shipping. Caliber subsidiaries included RPS, a small-package ground service; Roberts Express, an expedited shipping provider; Viking Freight, a regional, less-than-truckload freight carrier serving the Western United States; Caribbean Transportation Services, a provider of airfreight forwarding between the United States and the Caribbean; and Caliber Logistics and Caliber Technology, providers of logistics and technology services. FDX Corporation was founded to oversee all of the operations of those companies and its original air division, Federal Express.

In January 2000, FDX Corporation changed its name to FedEx Corporation and re-branded all of its subsidiaries. Federal Express became FedEx Express, RPS became FedEx Ground, Roberts Express became FedEx Custom Critical, and Caliber Logistics and Caliber Technology were combined to comprise FedEx Global Logistics. A new subsidiary, called FedEx Corporate Services, was formed to centralize the sales, marketing, and customer service for all of the subsidiaries. In February 2000, FedEx acquired Tower Group International, an international logistics company. FedEx also acquired WorldTariff, a customs duty and tax information company; TowerGroup and WorldTariff were re-branded to form FedEx Trade Networks.

21st century 

FedEx Corp. acquired privately held Kinko's, Inc. in February 2004 and re-branded it FedEx Kinko's. The acquisition was made to expand FedEx's retail access to the general public. After the acquisition, all FedEx Kinko's locations offered only FedEx shipping. In June 2008, FedEx announced that they would be dropping the Kinko's name from their ship centers; FedEx Kinko's would now be called FedEx Office. In September 2004, FedEx acquired Parcel Direct, a parcel consolidator, and re-branded it FedEx SmartPost.

In April 2015, FedEx acquired their rival firm TNT Express for €4.4 billion ($4.8 billion; £3.2 billion) as it looked to expand their operations in Europe.

In February 2016, FedEx announced the launch of FedEx Cares, a global giving platform, and committed to invest $200 million to strengthen more than 200 communities by 2020.

In March 2018, FedEx announced the acquisition of P2P Mailing Limited, a last-mile delivery service, for £92 million to expand their portfolio.

In June 2019, FedEx announced they would not be renewing their $850 million contract with Amazon for the company's U.S. domestic express delivery business. Amazon accounted for 1.3 percent of 2018 revenues. In August 2019, FedEx announced the termination of ground deliveries for Amazon as well.

In December 2020, FedEx acquired ShopRunner, an e-commerce platform.

On March 29, 2022, founder Frederick W. Smith announced he would be retiring as CEO and become executive chairman effective June 1, 2022. The company named Raj Subramaniam, FedEx's current president and COO, as Smith's successor.

Operating units 

FedEx Corporation divides its business into the following main operating units:

FedEx Express 

FedEx Express is the company's original overnight courier services, providing next day air service within the US and time-definite international service. It operates one of the largest civil aircraft fleets in the world, has the largest fleet of wide bodied civil aircraft, and carries more freight than any other airline. Included in this unit are:
 Caribbean Transport Services: Until 2008, part of FedEx Freight. Provides airfreight forwarding services between the US mainland, Puerto Rico, and other Caribbean destinations.
 TNT Express: Formerly an independent international courier delivery company headquartered in Hoofddorp, Netherlands, now a subsidiary of FedEx. It has fully owned operations in 61 countries, and delivers documents, parcels and freight to over two hundred countries.
 FedEx Custom Critical: Delivers urgent, valuable, or hazardous items using trucks and chartered aircraft. Drivers are independent owner/operators and services in Mexico use interline carriers. Formerly Roberts Express, a subsidiary of Caliber System.
 FedEx Cross Border: Provides information services, compliance management, and currency conversion services for cross-border retailers. Formerly Bongo International.

FedEx Ground 

FedEx Ground provides day-definite mail and package delivery to commercial locations in the US and Canada and residential locations in Canada. Its services are cheaper than the time-definite services offered by FedEx Express. The company was formerly Roadway Package System (RPS), a division of Caliber System. The unit also includes:
 FedEx Home Delivery: Provides domestic residential delivery services on an expanded schedule better suited to personal deliveries. Operates only in the US, residential deliveries in Canada are provided by FedEx Ground. The service's logo includes a drawing of a dog carrying a package.
 FedEx Ground Economy (formerly FedEx SmartPost): Consolidates parcels from merchants such as e-commerce and catalog companies, transports them in bulk between its hubs, and uses FedEx Ground or Home Delivery for final mile delivery. Formerly Parcel Direct, a subsidiary of catalog publisher Quad Graphics, acquired by FedEx in 2004.

FedEx Freight 

FedEx Freight is the largest less-than-truckload (LTL) freight carrier in the US, reporting  in revenue for 2021, and operates LTL and other freight services in the US and Canada. The unit was formed in 2002 when FedEx bought regional US LTL carrier American Freightways (AF) and established FedEx Freight as a parent company for AF, renamed FedEx Freight East, and FedEx's existing regional LTL subsidiary, Viking Freight, renamed FedEx Freight West. Viking had been a Caliber subsidiary when Caliber was acquired by FedEx in 1998. FedEx bought Lakeland, Florida-based national LTL carrier Watkins Motor Lines in 2006 and renamed it FedEx National LTL. All three operated as an independent subsidiaries of FedEx Freight  until January 2010 when they were merged with their parent to form a single entity, FedEx Freight Inc. The unit is the parent of:
 FedEx Freight Canada: Formerly Watkins Canada Express, the Canadian services of Watkins Motor Lines.

FedEx Logistics 

FedEx Logistics provides supply chain, specialty transportation, cross border e-commerce, customs brokerage, and trade management technology and services. The division was known as FedEx Trade Networks until January 2019 and is composed of a number of FedEx acquisitions as well as the operations of former Caliber subsidiaries Caliber Logistics and Caliber Technology. Divisions include:
 FedEx Air and Ocean Cargo Networks: International air and ocean freight forwarding. Formerly C.J. Tower & Sons, TowerGroup International Inc. (acquired by FedEx in 2000), and FedEx Trade Networks Transport & Brokerage, Inc.
 FedEx Customs Brokerage: Customs and international trade compliance services. Formerly World Tariff, Ltd. (acquired by FedEx in 2000) and FedEx Trade Networks Trade Services, Inc.
 FedEx Forward Depots: Critical inventory and service parts logistics. Also includes the TechConnect business equipment repair and refurbishment facilities, 3-D printing services, and the FedEx Packaging Lab.
 FedEx Supply Chain: Third-party logistics including transportation management, warehousing, fulfillment, and returns. Formerly GENCO.

FedEx Services 

FedEx Services provides corporate services to other FedEx operating companies. Specifically, all marketing, sales, pricing, data analytics, forecasting, finance, customer service, information technology, and their respective organizations (and cost centers) reside inside FedEx Services.  Customer facing transportation services and support managed by teams within FedEx Services include:
 FedEx Customer Relations: Operates customer service and customer support operations for other FedEx units including Express, Ground, Freight, and Office. Also manages customer operations at staffed locations, manages FedEx drop boxes, and provides internal corporate services. Formerly FedEx Customer Information Services (FCIS).
 FedEx Delivery Manager: Desktop and web software used by FedEx clients to create, track, and manage shipments.
 FedEx Express package services: Overnight and deferred small package transportation services (time definite services).
 FedEx Express Freight services: Overnight and deferred palletized freight transportation services (time definite services).
 FedEx Ground package services: Day definite ground based small package transportation services.
 FedEx Freight transportation services: Day definite ground based freight transportation services.
 FedEx Express International package services: Day definite air based small package transportation services.
 FedEx Express International freight services: Day definite air based palletized freight transportation services.
 FedEx.com online website support: Maintenance and development of all online assets owned by FedEx.

FedEx Dataworks 
A spin-off of FedEx Services, FedEx Dataworks is the youngest of FedEx's Operating Companies. FDW is focused on harnessing the power of the rich FedEx data ecosystem to transform the digital and physical customer experience creating solutions that build the network for what’s next by collaborating across the enterprise to integrate technology and services using Data Science and Machine Learning to help make shipping more efficient. Their first product was Surround, a software solution based on proactive monitoring and intervention controls across a delivery network whose first use was used in tracking critical shipments of COVID-19 vaccines.

FedEx Office 

FedEx Office is the retail arm of the corporation offering print and photocopy services, business services including signage and marketing, and retail sales of FedEx shipping services. The unit also includes FedEx SameDay City, a same-day delivery service. FedEx Office was formerly an independent company, Kinko's, until it was acquired by FedEx in 2004 and rebranded FedEx Kinko's. It was again rebranded in June 2008 becoming FedEx Office. Its divisions include:
 FedEx Office Print and Ship Centers: Successor to the original Kinko's operations. Also provide FedEx Hold at Location services, where a package can be delivered to and held at a FedEx Office location for later pickup by the receiver. FedEx Office also operates its own courier network for location to location and local delivery. Includes some locations previously called FedEx World Service Centers which predated FedEx's Kinko's acquisition.
 FedEx SameDay City: Same-day delivery courier providing Standard, pickup by noon and delivered by end of day, and Priority, delivery within two hours, services.

Competitors 
FedEx's primary competitor in the United States and most of its international destinations is United Parcel Service (UPS). Both companies employ generally similar strategies; both companies' largest hubs for its air delivery are in the southern United States (Memphis for FedEx and Louisville for UPS), both offer overnight, 2-day, and ground delivery as default options, both frequently use Ted Stevens Anchorage International Airport for trans-pacific shipments, and both of their main hubs are some of the world's busiest airports by cargo traffic. FedEx's other main competitor is the United States Postal Service (USPS), as USPS offers an overnight service (Priority Mail Express), a 2-5 day service (Priority Mail), and an economy/ground service (First Class, Parcel Select Ground). To a lesser extent in the US, FedEx competes with SF Express and DHL, and while DHL's market share in the United States is rising, the shipping industry (not including USPS) in the United States is primarily dominated by UPS and FedEx; DHL is only a strong competitor to FedEx outside of the United States.

Amazon, with its airline Amazon Air, its fleet of trucks, vans and ships and its worldwide staff of more than 1.4 million, plans to become the largest delivery service in the U.S.A.

Corporate identity

Logo 

The FedEx logo is a wordmark designed in 1994 by Lindon Leader of Landor Associates, of San Francisco. It consists of Fed in purple and Ex in orange. The FedEx wordmark is notable for containing a subliminal right-pointing arrow in the negative space between the "E" and the "X", which was achieved by designing a proprietary font, based on Univers and Futura, to emphasize the arrow shape. Leader believed the logo promoted FedEx as "getting from point A to point B reliably with speed and precision".

In the early 2000s, the Ex was in a different color for each division and platinum for the overall corporation use. However, in August 2016, FedEx announced that all operating units would adopt the purple and orange color logo over the next five years (the same as the original FedEx logo, and later used by FedEx Express).

Advertising 
FedEx advertising slogans have included:
 "When it Absolutely, Positively has to be there overnight" – 1978–1983
 "It's not Just a Package, It's Your Business" – 1987–1988
 "Our Most Important Package is Yours" – 1991–1994
 "Absolutely, Positively Anytime" – 1995
 "The Way the World Works," 1996–1998
 "Be Absolutely Sure," 1998–2000
 "This is a Job for FedEx," 2001–2002
 "Don’t worry, there's a FedEx for that,” 2002–2003
 "Relax, it’s FedEx," 2004–2008
 "The World On Time" 2001–present
 "We Understand," 2009–present
 "We Live To Deliver" 2009–present
 "Where now meets next" 2021–present

In 1981, FedEx's advertising firm Ally & Gargano hired performer John Moschitta, Jr., known for his fast speech delivery, to do an ad for Federal Express titled "Fast Paced World". This single commercial was cited years later by New York as one of the most memorable ads ever.

Sponsorships

Motorsports 

 From 1997 to 2002, FedEx was the title sponsor of Champ Car World Series when it was known as CART. The series was known as the "CART FedEx Championship Series", which led to the official "Champ Car" designation in reference to the fact they were the FedEx Championship.
 FedEx is the sponsor of the No. 11 NASCAR Cup Series Toyota, owned by Joe Gibbs Racing since 2005. The car has been driven by Denny Hamlin since 2006.
 FedEx previously sponsored the Formula One teams Benetton (1996–1999), Ferrari (1999–2001), Williams F1 (2002–2006), and McLaren (2007–2008).

Football 
 From 1989 to 2010, FedEx was the title sponsor of the Orange Bowl, played in Miami, Florida.
 FedEx Field, home of the National Football League's Washington Commanders in Landover, Maryland

Other sports 

 FedEx sponsors FedExForum, home of the NBA's Memphis Grizzlies and the University of Memphis men's basketball team.
 FedEx sponsors the Heineken Cup in rugby for the European markets only.
 Beginning in 2007, FedEx became the title sponsor of the FedEx Cup, a championship trophy for the PGA Tour.
 The WGC-Fedex St. Jude Invitational, a PGA Tour golf tournament and one of the four World Golf Championships held in Memphis, has been sponsored by FedEx from 1986 to 2006, in 2009, and currently since 2011.
 FedEx was the main sponsor of the UEFA Europa League since the 2015–21 cycle outside of the U.S. and Canadian markets.
 FedEx becomes the main global sponsors of the UEFA Champions League and the UEFA Super Cup, UEFA Youth League and the UEFA Futsal Champions League starting in the 2021–24 cycle.

Reputation 

The firm was named by Fortune magazine as one of the top 100 companies to work for in 2013, citing the company's choice to downsize with voluntary buyouts rather than involuntary layoffs.

Corporate affairs

Board of directors 

, the FedEx Corporation board of directors is:

 Marvin Ellison: Chairman, president and CEO, Lowe’s Companies, Inc.
 Tricia Griffith: President and CEO, The Progressive Corporation
 Kimberly A. Jabal: Former CFO, Unity Technologies
 Shirley Ann Jackson: President, Rensselaer Polytechnic Institute
 R. Brad Martin: Chairman, RBM Ventures
 Fred Perpall: CEO, The Beck Group
 Joshua Cooper Ramo: Chairman and CEO, Sornay LLC
 Susan Schwab: Professor Emerita, University of Maryland School of Public Policy
 Frederick W. Smith: Founder and Executive Chairman, FedEx Corporation
 David P. Steiner: Former CEO, Waste Management, Inc.
 Raj Subramaniam: President and CEO, FedEx Corporation
 Paul S. Walsh: Executive chairman, McLaren Group Limited

Finance 
For the fiscal year 2020, FedEx reported earnings of US$1.286 billion, with an annual revenue of US$69.217 billion, a decline of 0.7% over the previous fiscal cycle. FedEx's shares traded at over $273 per share, and its market capitalization was valued at over US$2,459 billion in December 2020. FedEx ranked No. 50 in the 2018 Fortune 500 list of the largest United States corporations by total revenue.

Environmental practices and initiatives 

In early March 2021, FedEx announced plans to make its operations carbon-neutral by 2040. It's investing $2 billion in sustainable energy initiatives, including $100M for a new Yale Center for Natural Carbon Capture and upgrading its aircraft and ground transportation fleets. It will be the first customer to take delivery of GM's electric Zevo delivery vans, as part of the goal of an all-electric ground fleet by 2040.

FedEx's initiatives to be carbon-neutral by 2040 will allow them to reduce their negative contributions to climate change drastically, however they may fall short of this goal. As mentioned in their 2021 10-K filling, they are at risk of being unable to achieve being carbon neutral by 2040 due to potential inability to execute the business operations as planned. Such risks are the costs associated with vehicle electrification and renewable energies. Additionally, the pace at which research and technological developments occur at pose a threat to FedEx's goal.

Success of Current Environmental Practices 
FedEx's current practices have allowed them to avoid several amounts of emissions. Their current fleet of electric vehicles and more efficient delivery routes have avoided roughly 950,000 metric tons of carbon dioxide emissions. Additionally, through the FedEx Fuel Sense program, FedEx was able to save about 221 million gallons of fuel and avoided nearly 2 million metric tons of carbon dioxide.

Political donations and lobbying 
According to OpenSecrets, FedEx Corp is the 174th largest campaign contributor in the United States, having donated over $35.96 million to federal candidates and committees since 1990, 37% of which went to Democrats and 63% to Republicans. Strong ties to the White House and members of Congress allow access to international trade and tax cut rebates as well as the rules of the business practices of the United States Postal Service. In 2001, FedEx sealed a $9 billion deal with the USPS to transport all of the post office's overnight and express deliveries.

In 2005, FedEx was among 53 entities that contributed the maximum of $250,000 to sponsor the second inauguration of President George W. Bush.

During the 2018 calendar year, FedEx spent nearly $10.2 million lobbying the federal government, its lowest total since 2008 but more than any other company in the air transport industry.

SCAC codes 
The Standard Carrier Alpha Code (SCAC) is a unique code used to identify transportation companies. It is typically two to four alphabetic letters long. It was developed by the National Motor Freight Traffic Association in the 1960s to help the transportation industry for computerizing data and records. FedEx's codes include:
 FXE – FedEx Express
 FXSP – FedEx SmartPost
 FXG – FedEx Ground
 FXFE – FedEx Freight
 FDCC – FedEx Custom Critical
 FXO – FedEx Office
 FSDC – FedEx Same Day City

Controversies and incidents

Labor relations 

In December 2007, the U.S. Internal Revenue Service "tentatively decided" the FedEx Ground Division might be facing a tax liability of $319 million for 2002, due to misclassification of its operatives as independent contractors. Reversing a 1994 decision which allowed FedEx to classify its operatives that own their own vehicles as independent contractors, the IRS audited the years 2003 to 2006, with a view to assessing whether similar misclassification of operatives had taken place. FedEx denied that any irregularities in classification had occurred, but faced legal action from operatives claiming benefits that would have accrued had they been classified as employees.

In June 2009, FedEx began a campaign against UPS and the Teamsters union, accusing its competitor of receiving a bailout in an advertising campaign called "Brown Bailout". FedEx claimed that signing the Federal Aviation Administration re-authorization bill, which would let some of its workers unionize more easily (and, according to the Memphis-based company, "could expose [its] customers at any time to local work stoppages that interrupted the flow of their time-sensitive, high-value shipments"), was equivalent to giving UPS a "bailout". Independent observers heavily criticized FedEx's wording, claiming that it was "an abuse of the term". FedEx Express employees are regulated under the Railway Labor Act.

In July 2020, the Air Line Pilots Association International (ALPA), the union that represents FedEx Corp pilots, called for a suspension on the company's Hong Kong operations. According to the union, some members were subject to "extremely difficult conditions" at hospitals urged by government mandates due to the COVID-19 pandemic. FedEx was criticized more broadly for providing inadequate protections and sick leave during the pandemic.

Allegations of controlled substances distribution 

On July 17, 2014, FedEx was indicted for conspiracy to distribute controlled substances in cooperation with the Chhabra-Smoley Organization and Superior Drugs. According to the U.S. Department of Justice, "FedEx is alleged to have knowingly and intentionally conspired to distribute controlled substances and prescription drugs, including Phendimetrazine (Schedule III); Ambien, Phentermine, Diazepam, and Alprazolam (Schedule IV), to customers who had no legitimate medical need for them based on invalid prescriptions issued by doctors who were acting outside the usual course of professional practice." A representative for the company contested these claims, stating that it would violate personal rights of customers to deny service and that "We are a transportation company — we are not law enforcement".  On July 17, 2016 the Department of Justice U.S. Attorney's Office confirmed in a statement that it had asked U.S. District Court Judge Charles Breyer to dismiss the indictment but also did not say why.

Illegal parking criticism 

Safe streets activists have criticized FedEx, along with other parcel delivery services, for frequently illegally parking their vehicles in bike lanes while making deliveries, a practice that endangers cyclists. They were criticized alongside peers in a letter from Washington, D.C.'s transportation agency in 2018.

Criticism of NRA partnership 

FedEx was criticized for its partnership with the National Rifle Association, which it terminated in 2018 under pressure from activists.

Huawei package delivery dispute 

On June 1, 2019, China filed a case against FedEx for allegedly undermining the rights of Chinese clients. The investigation stemmed from allegations by Huawei that FedEx attempted to divert the shipping route of its packages without the company's prior authorization. which in turn have been denied by FedEx. It has been reported that FedEx refused to deliver a used Huawei phone into the US. Writers at PC Magazine tried to ship a Huawei P30 from a UK office to a US one to find it sent back a few days later.

In July 2019, China accused FedEx of holding back more than 100 packages that Huawei was trying to deliver to China. Chinese regulators said that the company committed "violations" when it diverted Huawei parcels.

Allegations of tax avoidance 

In December 2019, CNBC listed FedEx along with 378 additional Fortune 500 companies that "paid an effective federal tax rate of 0% or less" as a result of the Tax Cuts and Jobs Act of 2017. The New York Times reported that FedEx paid $1.5 billion in taxes after the 2017 fiscal year (effective tax rate of 34%) and then $0 after the 2018 fiscal year (effective tax rate of 0%) as a result of lobbying done by the company.

Mass shooting at Indianapolis facility 

A FedEx Ground facility was the site of a mass shooting in Indianapolis on April 15, 2021, causing nine deaths (including the perpetrator) and at least 6 injuries. FedEx released a statement early the next morning, saying they were "deeply saddened" by the loss of their team members.

References

External links 

 
 

 
1971 establishments in Arkansas
1970s initial public offerings
American companies established in 1971
Companies based in Memphis, Tennessee
Companies in the Dow Jones Transportation Average
Companies listed on the New York Stock Exchange
Express mail
Logistics companies of the United States
Trucking companies of the United States
Multinational companies headquartered in the United States
Transport companies established in 1971
Transportation companies based in Arkansas
Transportation companies based in Tennessee